Battersia arctica is a species of algae belonging to the family Sphacelariaceae. In Iceland, it is listed as a critically endangered species (CR).

Synonym:
 Sphacelaria arctica Harvey, 1858''

References

Brown algae